Circuit Mont-Tremblant is a 4.26 km (2.65 mi) race circuit located approximately 130 km (80 mi) north of Montreal, Quebec, Canada.  It is the second-oldest existing race track in Canada, and was originally known as Circuit Mont-Tremblant-St-Jovite until it was renamed in the 1970s. Set in the shadow of the Mont-Tremblant ski hill, the twisting fifteen-corner track uses the natural topography and elevation of the land.

History

The idea was conceived by local business and hoteliers to boost tourism during the slower spring and summer periods to the levels they enjoyed during winter’s peak ski season.  

Legendary race driver Bruce McLaren is credited as a contributor to the design of the track which was completed in two sections; the original 2.51km (1.56mi) circuit was opened in 1964 and was extended to 4.27km (2.65mi) the following year.
The 1960’s – 1970’s

The first race was held August 3, 1964 on the original twelve-turn 2.51km (1.56mi) circuit and won by Ludwig Heimrath driving a Cooper-Ford.  The completion of the bridge, media/officials complex and the pit stalls were ready just prior to the next race that September featuring sports cars and prototypes. Pedro Rodríguez driving Luigi Chinetti’s (N.A.R.T) Ferrari 330 P would go on to win that race.

The Player’s Quebec Sports Car race in September 1965 would be the first event on the newly-expanded 4.27km (2.65mi) track and was won by John Surtees driving a Lola T-70.

On September 11, 1966 the track debuted the inaugural Canadian-American (CAN-AM) Challenge Cup Series Race. John Surtees would win this event, followed by Bruce McLaren and Chris Amon.  

The following summer, on 6 August 1967, Mario Andretti would win both races of the twin 100-mile double header U.S.A.C. Indy Car event ahead of A.J. Foyt. A year later, Andretti would the repeat the same achievement, this time beating out Bobby Unser. 

Circuit Mont-Tremblant hosted the Formula One Canadian Grand Prix on two occasions, in 1968 and 1970.  Jochen Rindt started the 1968 race from pole position, but Denny Hulme went on to win. The second race marked the debut of the Tyrrell Racing team as a constructor. Jackie Stewart set the pole time and a new track record in the new Tyrrell 001. The Ferraris of Jacky Ickx and Clay Regazzoni would finish 1st and 2nd ahead of Chris Amon in 3rd.  

Throughout the late 1960’s and 70’s many of North America’s other top tier race championships such as CAN-AM, Trans-Am, Formula 5000 and Formula Atlantic made their championship stops to the track. Many now famous drivers such as Denny Hulme, Bruce McLaren, Dan Gurney, Jackie Stewart, Bobby Rahal, Chris Amon, Mark Donohue, Roger Penske, Parnelli Jones, Al and Bobby Unser, Gordon Johncock, Alan Jones, Peter Revson, John Cannon, Elliot Forbes-Robinson, George Follmer and Gilles Villeneuve all competed at Circuit Mont-Tremblant during these years.

The 1980’s – 1990’s

Strong National Series such as the Rothmans Porsche (Turbo) Cup, the Players GM Challenge Series, the Honda-Michelin Series, Export A Formula 2000 and the Canadian Formula 1600 series would be predominant throughout the mid 1980’s and 90’s, giving rise to some of Canada's most prominent and recognized racing drivers, including Paul Tracy, Scott Goodyear, Rob Fellows, Greg Moore, Claude Bourbonnais, Richard Spenard, Patrick Carpentier and Alex Tagliani.

The Jim Russell Racing School

The circuit is also home to the well-known Jim Russell Racing Driver School (est. 1969) which is notable for graduating Gilles Villeneuve, Jacques Villeneuve, and more recently, current F1 drivers Lance Stroll and Nicholas Latifi.  

A CIK-FIA rated karting facility was added in 2010 to compliment the Jim Russell Racing School's development of young drivers, and has played host to the Canadian nationals.   

The 2000’s - present

New ownership has concentrated on updating the facility to improved FIA standards by repaving, widening the track, expanding the pit lane, and creating greater run-off areas without losing the character and charm of the original layout.  These updates have permitted the return of racing series like Grand Am (formerly CAN-AM) and Champcar (formerly Indy Car) along with Superbikes and Historic Racing.  The historic reputation of the race track and Mont-Tremblant’s appeal as a tourist destination keeps the track in constant demand amongst driving clubs, corporate events and major automotive manufacturers for car launches and driving programs such as Ferrari’s Corso Pilota, Lamborghini, Porsche, Audi, McLaren, Volvo, and BMW among others.  On July 21, 2022, the track complex was purchased by 11938053 Canada Inc., a company owned by Montreal businessman Gad Bitton of Holand Automotive Group.

Current series
Mopar Canadian Superbike Championship
Canadian Touring Car Championship
Ferrari Challenge
 Historic Motor Sports Association
 Formula Tour 1600

Former series and major race winners

FIA Formula One World Championship

Champ Car World Series

USAC Championship Car (IndyCar)

SCCA Can-Am Series

SCCA Trans-Am Series

SCCA United States Road Racing Championship

SCCA Formula 5000

Atlantic Championship

Grand American Road Racing Championship

Lap records 
The official race lap records at Circuit Mont-Tremblant (St. Jovite) are listed as:

See also
 List of auto racing tracks in Canada
 Other Montreal area race tracks
 Circuit Gilles Villeneuve
 Circuit ICAR
 Sanair Super Speedway

Notes

References

The Chequered Past: Sports Car Racing and Rallying in Canada, 1951–1991 By David A. Charters

External links 

 Official site

Champ Car circuits
Formula One circuits
Canadian Grand Prix
Sports venues in Quebec
Road racing venues in Canada
Motorsport venues in Quebec
Tourist attractions in Laurentides
Buildings and structures in Laurentides
1964 establishments in Quebec
Sports venues completed in 1964